Kâtip Çelebi, or  Haji Khalifa, is celebrated in the countries of the Islamic East as the author of the Kashf al-Zunun 'an Asami al-Kutub wa al-Funun (The Removal of Doubt from the Names of Books and the Arts). This bibliographic encyclopedia of books and sciences, written in Arabic, was based on the Miftāḥ al-Saʿāda wa-miṣbāḥ al-Siyādah  by the c.16th Ottoman historian, Taşköprüzade. However the Kaşf substantially enlarges it, cataloging titles of approximately 15,000 books; 9,500 names of authors; and 300 sciences and arts. The work is seen as a significant example of and contribution to Ottoman historiography. 

At the age of twenty-five in 1633, while in Aleppo, Celebi began compiling and composing the work; it occupied him for the next twenty years until its completion in 1652. An account of this is contained in another of his widely read books, "Mizan al-Haq," where he writes: "On my stay in Aleppo, I would visit bookshops to browse, and then when I had returned to Istanbul and came into some money, I began acquiring books and letters. In 1638, a relative died and left me a more substantial legacy, which was spent in large part collecting the great works which I had seen in Aleppo, Istanbul and in the public repositories of the Sultanate of Oman".Celebi died suddenly in 1657, leaving many works in unfinished or draft form.

Contents
Vol.1. Preface & Letter alif
Vol.2. Letters bá-jím
Vol.3. Letters há-sín
Vol.4. Letters shín-cáf
Vol.5. Letters káf-mím ( -moghíth)
Vol.6. Letters mím (mofátehat- )-yá 
Vol.7. Library catalogues of Cairo, Damascus, Aleppo, Rhodes and Istanbul.

Editions

Muhammad Azti Effendi Boshnah Zadeh (d. 1681).
Ibrahīm al-Rūmi al-Arabji (d. 1775) mentioned by Khalil al-Muradi in his biographic dictionary Silk al-Durar (Arabic).
Ahmed Hanífzádeh, Mollae El-Hájj Ibrahím Haníf Efendi, ed., (d.1802) titled (Athārnū). Contains 5000 books. Appended by Flügel in Vol.VI, Leipzig edition (1835–1858) with Latin translation and a volume for Oriental libraries.  
Sheikh Islam Aref Hikmat, ed., (d.1858) up to the letter jím (c). (See Al-Arab Al-Arab 2: 897).
Ishmael Pasha al-Baghdadi, ed., (d.1921), titled The Explanation of the Makenun. Contains 19000 books and was followed by translations of the authors (1941).
Ismail Saeb Singer, ed.

Jamil al-‘Uẓmā ('The Great Beauty')  (1933), titled al-Sirr al-Maṣūn ('Well-kept Secret' - kh) with introduction (1000 page) titled Book of Science and Travel.
Mohammed Al-Sadiq Al-Nefir (1938), titled Salwa Al-Mahzun.
Muhammad bin Mustafa al-Bakri ed., (d. 1782), Khulāsat Tahqíq az-Zunūn ('Investigation of Suspicions, abridged'); Index to al-Kashf and amendments.
Ali Khairi, ed., (d.1909) Ḍiyā’ al-‘Aiūn (Illumination of the Eminent); a footnote to al-Kashf.
Sources of Andalusian heritage: the publications of the Cultural Center in Abu Dhabi, pitfalls of correcting Haji Khalifa in dealing with the heritage of Andalusia.
Abridgement and supplement; Hussein Abbasi Nabhani Halabi, ed., (d.1684), titled ('The Complete Memorial of Antiquities').

Translations
 Lexicon Bibliographicum et Encyclopaedicum,(1835-58) Arabic-Latin by Gustav Leberecht Flügel
 Bibliothèque Orientale, (1697) French by Barthélemy d'Herbelot and Antoine Galland, with contributions from Johann Jacob Reiske and Henry Albert Schultens.

Notes

References

Bibliography

, (Vol.,2; Leipzig, 1837), (Vol.,3; London, 1842), (Vol.,4; London, 1845), (Vol.,5; London, 1850), (Vol.,6; London, 1852).
 , v.1 (A-E), v.2 (F-M), v.3 (N-Z)

Arabic literature
Islamic literature
Persian literature
Turkish literature
1650s books
17th-century encyclopedias